Gukje Market or Nampodong International Market is a market in Sinchang-dong, Jung District, Busan, South Korea. It opens from 9:30am to 7:30pm.

Gallery

See also
 List of markets in South Korea
 List of South Korean tourist attractions

References

External links
 Jung District - Gukje Market 

Retail markets in Busan
Jung District, Busan